Honor Oak Park railway station serves the suburban area of Honor Oak in the London Borough of Lewisham.

The station is operated by London Overground, with London Overground and Southern trains serving the station. Thameslink and some Southern services pass through the station. It is located in Travelcard Zone 3.

History
The line on which it stands was opened in 1839, but this station was only opened by the London, Brighton and South Coast Railway on 1 April 1886. The housebuilders who were developing the area contributed £1,000 towards the cost of construction. There are four tracks through the station, with platforms on the outer Slow lines. These platforms are connected to the booking office (see illustration) by a footbridge.  It was named to distinguish it from the Honor Oak station which existed at the time.

London Overground took over operating the station in September 2009, which has benefited from the London Overground East London Line extension, completed in May 2010. The East London line scheme has led to Honor Oak Park being well connected to other stations in South and East London with direct trains to Whitechapel (19 minutes), Shoreditch (23 minutes), Canada Water (10 minutes), London Victoria and London Bridge (11 minutes). Commuter areas such as Canary Wharf, Liverpool Street, Kings Cross and Waterloo are just one change of train away. From 2021 you will be able to directly interchange with Crossrail service at Whitechapel.

From 2018 this station may also benefit from the Thameslink Project which could introduce direct trains from Honor Oak Park through to London Bridge and on to Hertfordshire via St Pancras International. This would enable most of London to be accessible in a relatively short time compared to now. This will also coincide with Crossrail being constructed at Whitechapel ensuring that East-to-West as well as South-to-North London will be easily accessible from Honor Oak Park.

Services

Services at Honor Oak Park are operated by Southern and London Overground using  and  EMUs.

The typical off-peak service in trains per hour is:
 2 tph to 
 8 tph to  via 
 2 tph to  via 
 4 tph to 
 4 tph to 

Connections
London Buses routes P4 and P12 serve the station.

References

External links

Railway stations in the London Borough of Lewisham
Former London, Brighton and South Coast Railway stations
Railway stations in Great Britain opened in 1886
Railway stations served by London Overground
Railway stations served by Govia Thameslink Railway
1886 establishments in England
Honor Oak